The Association for Science in Autism Treatment (ASAT) is a non-profit autism organization. It was founded in 1998 and is currently based in Hoboken, New Jersey. Members of its advisory board include Eric Fombonne and Stephen Barrett, Tristam Smith was one of its board members until his death in August 2018.
A report by the Association for Behavior Analysis International mentioned ASAT's website as a useful resource for parents of children with autism, as does the website of the University of North Texas and that of the University of Michigan Health System.

Views
ASAT has warned against chelation therapy as an autism treatment, noting that two children have been reported to have died as a result of this therapy, and concluding that "there is not enough scientific evidence available at this time to advocate a role for chelation of heavy metals in the treatment of autism, and there is potential for adverse side effects." They take a similar viewpoint with regard to the use of secretin. Treatments they consider to be unproven, rather than disproven, include homeopathy and animal therapy. Published research related to the hundreds of autism treatments are provided on ASAT's website.

Criticism
ASAT was criticized in 1999 by Bernard Rimland, who contended that applied behavior analysis is not as effective as ASAT claims and called their position on autism treatments "nonsensical and counterfactual". ASAT responded by saying that, in recent years, the Autism Research Review International, where Rimland had published his article, had displayed "a consistent pattern of premature and uncritical promotion of treatment 'breakthroughs' in the absence of credible research support," including facilitated communication.

References

Autism-related organizations in the United States
Treatment of autism
Health and disability rights organizations in the United States
Mental health organizations in New Jersey
Scientific organizations established in 1998
1998 establishments in New Jersey